Talesh Mahalleh (also Romanized as Ţālesh Maḩalleh) is a village in Molla Sara Rural District, in the Central District of Shaft County, Gilan Province, Iran. At the 2006 census, its population was 626, in 157 families.

References 

Populated places in Shaft County